Janvs is a progressive black metal band from Genova, Italy. The band take their name from the Roman god Janus. They're known for using a Latin style of spelling in their band name and song/album names by replacing the letter "U" with the letter "V" (hence how Janus is spelled Janvs instead).

History
Janvs began in 2004 with Matteo Barelli on vocals/guitar, Claudio Fogliato on bass, and Francesco La Rosa on drums. They released their debut album Nigredo on September 1, 2004, limited to a hand-numbered 88 total copies. Their next album didn't come until 2007, entitled Fvlgvres, the album is a concept album about "the shattering of human limits and condition, upon the longing and the temporary conquest of real moments of awareness and contact with the peaks of transcendence." The band released a song called "Pietas I" on a sampler called B.M.I.A. Compilation. In 2008 the band's original drummer, Francesco, left the group. He has since been replaced by respected Italian drummer Massimo Altomare (m:A Fog), making Janvs one of the many musical projects he has become a part of. The band has also been covered in well-known metal magazines, such as Terrorizer (even having a controversy with each other) and Decibel. They have been described as being musically akin to bands such as Ulver.

Members

Current members
Matteo "Vinctor" Barelli – vocals, guitar, keyboards, programming
Claudio "Malphas" Fogliato – bass
Massimo "m:A Fog" Altomare – drums

Former members
Francesco La Rosa – drums, keyboards, samples

Discography
Nigredo (2004; reissued in 2014)
Fvlgvres (2007)
Vega (2008)

References

External links
Official website
Official MySpace page
ATMF record label website

Italian progressive metal musical groups
Italian black metal musical groups
Post-metal musical groups